Dierna is a genus of moths of the family Erebidae erected by Francis Walker in 1859.

Description
Palpi with second joint upcurved, slender and reaching above vertex of head. Third joint long and acute. Thorax and abdomen smoothly scaled and slender. Forewings with acute apex. Hindwings with short inner margin. Outer margin angled at vein 2. Vein 5 from near lower angle of cell.

Species
From the Global Lepidoptera Names Index:
Dierna lilacea Bethune-Baker, 1906
Dierna patibulum Fabricius, 1794
Dierna strigata Moore, 1867
Dierna timandra Alphéraky, 1897

References

Calpinae